is a Japanese social activist, journalist, accountant and politician who is the founder and leader of the . A former assemblyman for the Funabashi City Assembly and the Katsushika Ward Assembly, he was elected to the House of Councillors in the July 2019 regular election on his party's proportional representation list. He automatically forfeited his seat on 10 October when he officially became a candidate in the October 2019 by-election to the House of Councillors for a majoritarian seat in Saitama.

Career 
He was an accountant, program producer and executive assistant of Katsuji Ebisawa, the chairman of NHK from 1997 through 2005. He leaked information about NHK's accounting scandals to the Shukan Bunshun in 2005, which forced him to retire. He founded an internet watchdog TV show concentrating on NHK in 2011.

Political career 
In November 2017, he won the Katsushika ward assembly election in Tokyo at 2954 votes. On 27 December, the Tokyo District Court dismissed his request to sue the owner of one seg cell phone for the contract of NHK bill collection. In June 2018, the Tokyo High Court supported the district court's decision.

Tachibana leads The Party to Protect the People from NHK, which distributes stickers for the purpose of expelling NHK reception bill collectors. He supports scrambled broadcasting of NHK, such that only viewers who want to watch NHK need to pay the broadcast fees.

Tachibana was elected as a member of Japan's House of Councillors at the election for the House of Councillors at 2019.

He acknowledged he had bipolar disorder and schizophrenia.

In May 2020, Tachibana founded the Horiemon New Party. Tachibana named the party after entrepreneur Takafumi Horie (who was given the nickname "Horiemon" due to his resemblance to the manga character Doraemon) and uses Horie's likeliness in campaign ads. Despite this, Horie has publicly stated that he does not have any connection to the party and that Tachibana used his name and likeliness without his permission.

Controversies

Shingo Watanabe video 
Tachibana published a video about Shingo Watanabe, a member of Settsu city assembly. The video alleged that Watanabe knew the condition of the corpse of Moritomo Gakuen officials. Watanabe made a libel for criminal charge and damages against Tachibana. The Tokyo High Court, in charge of criminal litigation, charged him with an indemnification in the civil litigation and ordered a fee of 300,000 yen. Watanabe then criticized Tachibana who insisted that the case was without foundation, stated that there was a problem in the law mind spirit, and refused to pay the 300,000 yen fee.

Comments justifying genocide 
In September 2019, Tachibana was reported by Asahi Shimbun to have appeared in a video where he appeared to justify the use of genocide as a solution for overpopulation. In the video, he also questioned Japan's aid for underdeveloped countries, saying that poverty and violence were part of "The natural order God created." He also stated in reference to third world countries: "It’s impossible to teach dogs. (They’re) close to being dogs. There are an overwhelming number of people like that in the world. These countries have babies to the point of idiocy." In a subsequent video issued on his YouTube channel, he rejected these reports, said he was not in favor of such policies, and that he only said these things in order to generate controversy and media coverage.

Conviction for forcible obstruction of business 
In September 2019, Tachibana recorded video footage of a business mobile terminal displaying the personal information of NHK subscribers. In November 2019, he contacted the NHK and threatened to release the subscriber information online. This resulted in the broadcaster being forced to provide explanations to relevant subscribers. Tachibana was subsequently tried and convicted of forcible obstruction of business. In January 2022, he received a suspended sentence of two and a half years in prison.

Electoral record

References

External links 

1967 births
Living people
Japanese activists
Japanese journalists
Members of the House of Councillors (Japan)
NHK
Japanese municipal councilors
Politicians from Chiba Prefecture
Politicians from Tokyo
People from Izumiōtsu, Osaka
People with bipolar disorder
People with schizophrenia
Japanese YouTubers
Politicians from Osaka Prefecture